This is a list of college athletics programs in the U.S. state of Tennessee.

NCAA

Division I

Division II

Division III

NAIA

NJCAA

NCCAA

See also 
List of NCAA Division I institutions
List of NCAA Division II institutions
List of NCAA Division III institutions
List of NAIA institutions
List of USCAA institutions
List of NCCAA institutions

Tennessee
College athletic programs
College sports in Tennessee
College athletic programs